This is a list of episodes for the second season of Survive This, a Canadian reality TV show on which eight teenagers with limited survival skills training are taken into a forest and confronted with a number of survival challenges to test their skills and perseverance. The show is hosted by Les Stroud, who narrates each episode, provides the teens with survival challenges, and assesses their performance. 

The second season premiered on April 19, 2010, on YTV, a Canadian English-language cable television specialty channel.

Participants
Participants were selected for the show, in part, based on their strong personalities. All the participants were required to take a three-day survival program with David Arama, a wilderness survival expert and close friend of Les Stroud's. Training including how to build a shelter, fire-starting, edible plants, and using a compass.  The season two cast included:
Colin—Colin is a 15-year-old from Hamilton, Ontario. He believes that a balance between school and friends is important. He was named "Ultimate Survivor" by Les Stroud.
Ian—Ian McBain is a 14-year-old from Ajax, Ontario. Interested in animals and the outdoors and seeking a career as a biologist, McBain was inspired to audition for the second season after seeing the first season episode Swamp: "The episode from the first season that really motivated me to try to get on the show was the swamp episode. "Most people would think 'Oh gross. a swamp, there's leaches and stuff.' That was the turning point for me, I was like 'I have to get on this show, that looks so fun, so many different experiences.'" McBain, who admits to being an unadventurous "wimp", says that he learned to trust other people and believe in himself during the show. For him, the toughest part of the series was getting through the nights and worrying about wild animal attacks.
Jade—Jade is a 13-year-old girl from Ancaster, Ontario. She was raised on a farm.
Justin—Justin Cutajar is a 16-year-old from Mississauga, Ontario. He had auditioned for the first season but did not make the cut. He auditioned for the second season because he still wanted to see how far he could push himself. He says being on the show was "a life-altering experience." The hardest part, for him, was the lack of food; he lost  while filming the series. Back at home after the show, he says he never leaves food on his plate and reminds himself every day of how he has a bed to sleep in and home to live in. He cites patience, emotional strength, the will to live, and physical strength as the things which allowed him to get through the show.
Manaal—Manaal Ismacil is a 16-year-old from St. Catharines, Ontario. Her mother is a Somalian who is a refugee from Somalia. Manaal was born in Kenya, but her family emigrated to the United States when she was seven years old and to Canada four years later. She attends Sir Winston Churchill Secondary School, loves to read and study, and has never been camping. She had not seen the first season, but applied after being urged to do so by her younger sister (who had). She is interested in International relations, and wants a career as a human rights lawyer. She is a volunteer in many groups, including her school, the St. Catharines mayor's council, and Save the Children Canada.
Michael—Michael Lattouf is a 17-year-old from Brampton, Ontario, who attends Notre Dame Catholic Secondary School and wants to be an actor. He had no survival skills prior to appearing on the show. He says that he felt overwhelmed at first. The producers and Les Stroud "just threw us right in, and it was non-stop," and he felt the lack of food was the most challenging aspect of the show. He also felt that having eight teenagers on the show made for a lot of emotion. Lattouf says the show was very challenging, and he learned a great deal from it. "People live like this every day—homeless people, or people in poor countries—and it made me understand their struggles more."
Nicole—Nicole Ponce is a 14-year-old who is heavily involved in school athletics.
Patricia—Patricia Robins is a 16-year-old from Niagara Falls, Ontario, who is somewhat socially rebellious. She attends Stamford Collegiate Secondary School. She applied to be on the show without having seen the first season. She believed that only actors were admitted to the show, and felt that this would be a boost to her acting career. After seeing the first season, she resolved to turn down the show if offered a chance to compete and then later changes her mind. Labeled as "the rebel" on the show, she says she is more of a diva.

List of Season Two (2010) episodes

References

External links
 "Survive This" official Web site
 "Survive This" on the YTV Web site

2010 Canadian television seasons